Zeiten ändern dich (english title Time You Change) is a German biographical film directed by Uli Edel and starring rapper Bushido, as well as Elyas M'Barek and Moritz Bleibtreu. The film is based on Bushido's 2008 autobiography.
 The film premiered in Berlin on 3 February 2010.

Plot 
During a performance tour in Germany, Anis Ferchichi (Bushido) celebrates his birthday with his crew on the tour bus. Ferchichi gets a letter from his father. This brings back memories of his difficult childhood in Berlin which are then shown through flashbacks.

Ferchichi spends his childhood in a deprived area of Berlin with his Tunisian father, German mother, and younger brother Sercan. He grows up in a violent environment and often watches his father beating his mother. He is a poor student, but embraces music.

He goes to college and leaves his girlfriend after she has been unfaithful to him. He earns a lot of money selling drugs and celebrates his success as a drug dealer at a party, where he meets Selina, who becomes his new girlfriend.

One day, drug dealers break into the apartment Ferchichi shares with his family, tie up his mother and his brother Sercan, ransack their possessions and steal their money. After this experience, Ferchichi spends more time with his friends.

Years later, Ferchichi, now an adult, starts freestyle rapping with his friends, including Patrick Losensky (Fler). A video game inspires Ferchichi to call himself "Bushido". He and Losensky sign a record contract with the record label Hardcore Berlin, based on Aggro Berlin. Bushido leaves Hardcore Berlin after a dispute with his manager as the film ends.

Production 
Karel Gott appears and performs the song "Für immer jung" at the Brandenburger Tor alongside Bushido.
Martin Semmelrogge has a cameo appearance as a tattoo artist.
Fler designed the graffiti appearing in the film.
In the film, Aggro Berlin is called "Hardcore Berlin" and Sido is called "Skull Pal".

Cast

Bushido as Bushido
Moritz Bleibtreu as Arafat
Karoline Schuch as Selina
Elyas M'Barek as Young Bushido
Hannelore Elsner as Bushido's Mother
Katja Flint as Selina's Mother
Uwe Ochsenknecht as Selina's Father
Mina Tander as Bushido's Mother (Young)
Werner Daehn as Zivilpolizist
Mehdi Nebbou

Soundtrack

Information taken from the film's end credits.

Songs taken from Bushido albums:
"Zeiten ändern sich" and "Reich mir nicht deine Hand" (from 7)
"Electrofaust" credited as "Dein Bezirk" (Rap Acappella) (from Vom Bordstein bis zur Skyline)
"4, 3, 2, 1 (Vielen Dank Aggro Berlin)" and "Für immer jung" (feat. Karel Gott) (from Heavy Metal Payback)
"Intro" (from King of KingZ)

Other songs:
"Freestyle" – Bushido
"Weißt du wohin" – Karel Gott
"Beats" – Bushido feat. Sissi Boo
"Die Biene Maja" – Karel Gott
"Go Get It" – Calvin Samuel, Josh Kessler, Keith Salandy & Marc Ferrari
"Belly Dancer" – Philippe Guez
"Nomad's Land" – Philippe Guez
"Gangsta" – Derrick Carolina, Jahmal Durham & Mack Tompkins
"After The Violence" – Andrea Coclough
"Bedouin Life" – Robert Joseph Walsh
"Jail Time" – Jack Elliot
"Let Me See You Move" – Eliot Pulse & Ray Mitti
"Baza" – George Fenion & John Herbert Leach
"Boogie" – Stephan "Gudze" Hinz

References

External links 
  
 

German biographical drama films
2010s German-language films
2010 films
Films directed by Uli Edel
Films produced by Bernd Eichinger
Films with screenplays by Bernd Eichinger
2010s hip hop films
Films set in Berlin
Biographical films about musicians
2010s German films